Patrick Belton (7 November 1884 – 30 January 1945) was an Irish nationalist, politician, farmer, and businessman. Closely associated with Michael Collins, he was active in the 1916 Easter Rising and in the Republican movement in the years that followed. Belton later provided a strong Catholic voice in an Irish nationalist context throughout his career. He was strongly anti-communist and he was a founder and leader of the Irish Christian Front. Supportive of Francisco Franco, Belton however opposed Eoin O'Duffy taking an Irish Brigade to Spain, feeling that they would be needed in Ireland to counter domestic "political ills".

Nationalist beginnings
Belton was born in 1884 in Rathcline, near Lanesborough, County Longford, the youngest of seven children of Richard Belton, a farmer, and Mary Belton (née Rhatigan).

He attended the local national school and subsequently won a scholarship to King's College, London. Following his education, he stayed in London and entered the Civil Service. He became very friendly with Arthur Griffith and Michael Collins at this time. In 1905, he was present at the establishment of Sinn Féin in London, and in November 1909, according to some sources, he initiated Michael Collins into Irish Republican Brotherhood (IRB). He was a prominent member of the Geraldines GAA Club in London, and he was for many years its president. In 1909 he became Secretary of the London County Board of the GAA.

In 1910 he was transferred to the Irish Land Commission in Dublin.

1916 and after
Belton took part in the 1916 Easter Rising. His obituary in the Longford Leader noted that he "… was associated with Michael Collins and other London comrades when they came to Ireland in 1916 for the Rising. After the Rising he was suspended from the Land Commission on suspicion of having been connected with the event, but was later reinstated". A detailed narrative of his activities during the 1916 Rising is contained in a handwritten letter he sent in 1937 to Máire English, supporting her claim to a Military Service Pension. It suggests that he was either physically in the GPO at some stage during the Rising, or in some way attached to the insurgents based there.

After reports in 1918 that 'large bodies of Sinn Féiners' had assembled and were drilling on his lands, the police raided his house on 30 July. While some of those present managed to escape, two revolvers and more than fifty rounds of ammunition were discovered in the house. Various papers were found which showed Belton's involvement with the Irish National Aid Association, the Irish Volunteer Dependants' Fund, Sinn Féin, and the Patriots' Graves Committee. There was a pass admitting the bearer to the graveside of Thomas Ashe on the day of his funeral. On 31 August 1918, Belton was sentenced to six months imprisonment with hard labour for possessing arms and ammunition. He served his sentence in Mountjoy and Belfast jails.

In the 1923 general election, he stood unsuccessfully for the National Democratic Party in Leix–Offaly.

Events of 1927
Belton was elected as a Fianna Fáil Teachta Dála (TD) for Dublin County in the June 1927 general election. In the eight-seat constituency, he was the third person to be elected, after Kevin O'Higgins (of Cumann na nGaedheal), who would be assassinated one month later, and Bryan Cooper. Fianna Fáil, which had been founded in 1926 by Éamon de Valera, contested Free State elections but its policy was to refuse to take seats in the Dáil; this was because the Oath of Allegiance, agreed in the Treaty, required all TDs to swear, : "I will be faithful to H.M. King George V, his heirs and successors …"

The 5th Dáil first met on 23 June 1927. On 26 July, Belton broke with Fianna Fáil policy, taking the Oath of Allegiance and entering the Dáil. The next day's paper quoted him as saying that he was taking his seat in the hope of saving the nation "from the degradation and destruction" which he believed the passage of proposed new legislation would involve. These measures included, in addition to the Electoral Amendment Bill (requiring inter alia that all Dáil candidates take the Oath of Allegiance), a Public Safety Bill incorporating tough new measures, and which was partly a reaction to the assassination on 10 July of Kevin O'Higgins by IRA members. The National Executive of Fianna Fáil expelled him from the party and called on him to resign his seat. Éamon de Valera said: "As for Mr Belton, everybody who was not absolutely blind could see that Mr Belton, since his election, has been manoeuvring for an opportunity to go in and take the oath. He will be alone, however."

At the time of his dismissal from Fianna Fáil, Belton had been a TD for only six weeks. On 11 August, de Valera and the 42 other Fianna Fáil TDs altered their policy and decided to take the Oath, characterising it as "merely an empty political formula".

Belton lost his seat in the general election of September 1927, in which he stood as an Independent. From this time onward, there was a mutual and obvious enmity between Belton and de Valera.

He joined Cumann na nGaedheal in 1933, and was returned as a TD for Dublin North at the 1933 general election. In 1933, the party merged with the National Centre Party and the Blueshirts to form Fine Gael, with Eoin O'Duffy, leader of the Blueshirts, becoming the first leader of Fine Gael. The following year, O'Duffy was pushed out as party leader. Belton sided with O'Duffy, leading his own expulsion.

Irish Christian Front
On 22 August 1936, the Irish Independent called for the formation of a committee to help the (pro-Franco) citizens of Spain in their war effort. These calls for support resulted in the formation of the Irish Christian Front (ICF). The ICF held its initial meeting at the Mansion House in Dublin on 31 August 1936. Belton became the organisation's president. The group had overwhelming support from the general population as well as the backing of the Catholic Church.

The ICF claimed that it was non-sectarian, in order to build up its support base. It also claimed to be non-political, interested only in helping the church in Spain and not partisan politics. Despite these claims, the organisations' ideological leanings soon became apparent:

The ICF would hold pro-Catholic and anti-communist rallies, drawing an estimated crowd of 40,000 on one occasion, and would seek to publicise the massacres committed by the Spanish Republicans. In November 1936, Belton travelled to Spain to arrange for a shipment of medical supplies to be purchased with funds raised from church-gate collections.  However, Belton, a supporter of nationalist Spain, claimed that the important battle was to be fought at home and not abroad. Belton opposed Eoin O'Duffy's dispatching of the Irish Brigade in the Spanish Civil War, opposing the move on the grounds that he believed the battle against communism would be fought at home, not abroad. During this time, Belton began openly engaging in antisemitism:

The ICF's popularIty would dwindle following Belton's loss in the 1937 general election, as well as its inability to change the government's policy on Spain and in the face of heavy casualties suffered by O'Duffy's volunteers.

Later life 
Belton had been involved in farming and/or market gardening from an early stage, even dating back to his time in the Land Commission. In 1917 he had acquired a sizeable holding at Belfield Park in Drumcondra, and in 1938 he moved to a farm at Bellevue Park, Killiney on Dublin's southside. In 1937, he was active building several hundred houses at Belton Park, part of Puckstown Lane, which he renamed Collins Avenue. He also became active in the licensed trade, opening a public house on Collins Avenue. Around that time, however, his health seems to have taken a turn for the worse.

Reporting to the October 1937 Special Convention of the ICF, the organisation's honorary secretary stated that in April Belton “suffered from a severe breakdown in health caused by overwork, principally his efforts on behalf of the Irish Christian Front, and more especially by hardships undergone by him through his journey to Spain. His illness necessitated a considerable slowing down of activities.” Despite this deterioration in health, he was elected as a Fine Gael TD for Dublin County at the 1938 general election. In 1939, he attempted to buy Glencairn House from Boss Croker's estate, but the sale fell through. He lost his Dáil seat at the 1943 general election.

He died on 30 January 1945, at his home in Killiney, County Dublin.

On 2 October 1912, he married Mary (Molly) Fitzgibbon, a civil servant from Limerick who had been working in London; they had four sons. Three of them – Richard, Jack and Paddy – served as members of the Oireachtas, and also his granddaughter, Avril Doyle.

Quotes
"I did not agree with the wisdom of Irishmen going out to Spain." — Irish Press (26 November 1936)

"I have never been a party politician in the sense that I would obey the orders of any political junta who would tell me to do a thing, whether I considered it right or wrong." — Irish Press (30 January 1937)

See also
Families in the Oireachtas

References

External links
 

1884 births
1945 deaths
Antisemitism in Ireland
Irish anti-communists
Irish far-right politicians
Irish Roman Catholics
Politicians from County Longford
Cumann na nGaedheal TDs
Fine Gael TDs
Fianna Fáil TDs
Members of the 5th Dáil
Members of the 8th Dáil
Members of the 10th Dáil
Alumni of King's College London
20th-century Irish farmers
Belton family